Prince Julius of Schleswig-Holstein-Sonderburg-Glücksburg (14 October 1824, Gottorp, Schleswig, Schleswig – 1 June 1903, Itzehoe, Schleswig-Holstein, Prussia, Germany) was the eighth of the ten children of Friedrich Wilhelm, Duke of Schleswig-Holstein-Sonderburg-Glücksburg and Princess Louise Caroline of Hesse-Kassel.

Biography
In 1863, Prince Julius was sent to Greece with his young nephew, Prince Vilhelm of Denmark, who had recently ascended to the throne of Greece as King of the Hellenes, as an advisor. Eighteen months later, the King returned from a walk to discover that, whilst he was out, Julius had invited seven ministers associated with the former, and deeply unpopular, King Otto to the Palace to discuss the removal of Count Sponneck, another of the King's advisors. Indignant at what he saw as an attempt at a palace putsch, the King ordered Julius to leave Greece within one week.

Julius contracted a morganatic marriage with Elisabeth von Ziegesar (1856–1887), daughter of Wolf von Ziegesar, on 2 July 1883. After their marriage, she was styled Countess von Roest.

Honours
 :
 Knight of the Elephant, 13 October 1864
 Cross of Honour of the Order of the Dannebrog, 13 October 1864
 Commemorative Medal for the Golden Wedding of King Christian IX and Queen Louise, 1892
  Ascanian duchies: Grand Cross of Albert the Bear, 4 October 1853
 : Grand Cross of Henry the Lion, 1847
    Ernestine duchies: Grand Cross of the Saxe-Ernestine House Order, May 1867
  Kingdom of Prussia: Knight of the Red Eagle, 1st Class, 10 March 1881

Ancestry

References

External links 

1824 births
1903 deaths
People from Schleswig, Schleswig-Holstein
Princes of Schleswig-Holstein-Sonderburg-Glücksburg
House of Schleswig-Holstein-Sonderburg-Beck
Recipients of the Cross of Honour of the Order of the Dannebrog